Stagecoach War is a 1940 American Western film directed by Lesley Selander, written by Norman Houston and Harry F. Olmsted, and starring William Boyd, Russell Hayden, Julie Carter, Harvey Stephens, J. Farrell MacDonald, Britt Wood and Rad Robinson. It was released on July 12, 1940, by Paramount Pictures.

Plot

Cast 
 William Boyd as Hopalong Cassidy
 Russell Hayden as Lucky Jenkins
 Julie Carter as Shirley Chapman
 Harvey Stephens as Neal Holt
 J. Farrell MacDonald as Jeff Chapman
 Britt Wood as Speedy
 Rad Robinson as Gang Leader Smiley
 Eddy Waller as Wells Fargo Agent Quince Cobalt
 Frank Lackteen as Twister Maxwell
 Jack Rockwell as Matt Gunther 
 Eddie Dean as Henchman Tom
 The King's Men as Singing Outlaws

References

External links 
 
 
 
 

1940 films
American black-and-white films
1940s English-language films
Films directed by Lesley Selander
Paramount Pictures films
American Western (genre) films
1940 Western (genre) films
Hopalong Cassidy films
1940s American films